Pseudophorticus is a genus of beetles in the family Carabidae, containing the following species:

 Pseudophorticus lucidus (Bates, 1884)
 Pseudophorticus puncticollis Erwin, 2004
 Pseudophorticus semirufus Bates, 1878
 Pseudophorticus subauratus Bates, 1883

References

Lebiinae
Taxa named by Terry Erwin